The Pospiviroidae are a family of viroids, including the first viroid to be discovered, PSTVd.   Their secondary structure is key to their biological activity. The classification of this family is based on differences in the conserved central region sequence. The genome consists (in this order) of an LH terminal domain, a pathogenic domain, conserved central region (pospiviroid RY motif stem loop), variable domain, and an RH terminal domain. Pospiviroidae replication occurs in an asymmetric fashion via host cell RNA polymerase, RNase, and RNA ligase.

Taxonomy
The family contains the following genera:

 Apscaviroid
 Cocadviroid
 Coleviroid
 Hostuviroid
 Pospiviroid

References

External links
ICTV Report: Pospiviroidae
 – extensive information on pospivirioidae and viroids.

Viroids